Anette Ree Andersen (born 16 October 1967) is a Danish sailor. She competed in the Tornado event at the 1992 Summer Olympics.

References

External links
 

1967 births
Living people
Danish female sailors (sport)
Olympic sailors of Denmark
Sailors at the 1992 Summer Olympics – Tornado
Sportspeople from Copenhagen